Auriolus is a genus of longhorn beetles of the subfamily Lamiinae, containing the following species:

 Auriolus geniculatus Lepesme & Breuning, 1950
 Auriolus presidentialis Lepesme, 1947

References

Tragocephalini
Cerambycidae genera